The New Britain friarbird (Philemon cockerelli) is a species of bird in the family Meliphagidae.
It is endemic to Papua New Guinea.

Its natural habitats are subtropical or tropical moist lowland forests and subtropical or tropical moist montane forests.

References

New Britain friarbird
Birds of New Britain
New Britain friarbird
New Britain friarbird]
Taxonomy articles created by Polbot